Subcamps, also translated as satellite camps, were outlying detention centres (Haftstätten) that came under the command of a main concentration camp run by the SS in Nazi Germany and German-occupied Europe. The Nazis distinguished between the main camps (or Stammlager) and the subcamps (Außenlager or Außenkommandos) subordinated to them. Survival conditions in the subcamps were, in many cases, poorer for the prisoners than those in the main camps.

Emergence of the concept 
Within a concentration camp prisoners had to carry out various tasks. They were not supposed to be idle whilst interned. The work could even be pointless and vexatious, without any useful output. Based on military language the SS designated such prisoner task forces as "details" or Kommandos; the generic term being the "works details"  (Arbeitskommandos) of a camp. For example, in Dachau concentration camp there was a "Crematorium Works Detail" (Arbeitskommando Krematorium), which was put together from a group of concentration camp prisoners; they were separately accommodated and were to have no contact with the other prisoners. Kommandos that were charged with construction tasks were overseen by prisoner functionaries known as Kapos.

Whether a prisoner was assigned to a physically easy or difficult Kommando affected his chances of survival. A Kommando within a building, for example carrying out technical work, was more bearable for prisoners than Kommandos who found themselves working in the open in winter during freezing temperatures.

KZ Außenkommandos 
Dachau was the first concentration camp that Reichsführer-SS Himmler had built. It was already in existence in 1933 and developed into a prototype for subsequent concentration camps such as Buchenwald, which appeared in 1937. But even Dachau concentration camp was not geographically restricted to Dachau itself. In addition to the Kommandos that had to be formed within the camp itself, were soon added Kommandos that worked outside the camp, for example the herb plantation detail (Kommando der Kräuterplantage) or the works details assigned to peat cutting.  The SS increasingly deployed prisoners outside their concentration camp and made them build installations such as roads, ditches, barracks or SS recreation homes. Concentration camp prisoners were even used for the private purposes of senior Nazi officers: for Oswald Pohl's country house of Brüningsau, for Himmler's Hunting Lodge and also for the country house of Hans Loritz, the commandant of Dachau. Even Eleonore Baur, a personal friend of Hitler's, was given her own Kommando.

Many of these works details were only established for weeks or months and their strength varied. In the language used at the time for Kommandos whereby prisoners stayed overnight outside the concentration camp were also called Außenkommandos.

In several cases Außenkommandos developed into new, independent concentration camps: Mauthausen concentration camp began in August 1938 with the arrival of the first prisoner details from Dachau. Niederhagen concentration camp was also formed from a KZ Außenkommando. Mittelbau-Dora concentration camp was initially a subcamp of Buchenwald and later became an independent concentration camp.

KZ Außenlager 

At the onset of war the SS increasingly employed concentration camp prisoners in armaments factories. In some cases the prisoners were accommodated in diverse, makeshift sleeping areas; in other cases the SS had them erect their own camp with watchtowers and fences. Many such subcamps (KZ-Außenlager) were laid out in similar fashion to the concentration camps. There were also SS camp commanders (SS-Lagerführer) and prisoner functionaries such as the "camp senior" (Lagerältester) or "block senior" (Blockältester).

Today the camps are known as subcamps (in German either as KZ-Außenlager or Nebenlager). Sometimes the colloquial abbreviation "KZ" is used, but this can also refer to a main camp.

In the hierarchy of the Nazi camp system, subcamps were subordinated to a concentration camp that, for example, held the prisoner records and the death registers. Often the supply of food was poorer than that of the main camp, quite apart from the condition of the sanitary facilities or sleeping arrangements for the prisoners. In subsequent Nazi documents the subcamps are sometimes also referred to as works camps (Arbeitslager).

Lists 
The following articles list the subcamps under individual main camps of a particular concentration camp:

 List of subcamps of Auschwitz
 List of subcamps of Buchenwald
 List of subcamps of Dachau
 List of subcamps of Flossenbürg
 List of subcamps of Gross-Rosen
 List of subcamps of Hinzert
 List of subcamps of Herzogenbusch
 List of subcamps of Kraków-Płaszów
 List of subcamps of Majdanek
 List of subcamps of Mauthausen
 List of subcamps of Mittelbau
 List of subcamps of Natzweiler-Struthof
 List of subcamps of Neuengamme
 List of subcamps of Ravensbrück
 List of subcamps of Sachsenhausen
 List of subcamps of Stutthof

References

Literature 
 Wolfgang Benz, Barbara Distel (ed.): KZ-Außenlager. Geschichte und Erinnerung. In: Dachauer Hefte No. 15, Verlag Dachauer Hefte, 1999.
 Joanna Skibinska: Die letzten Zeugen. Gespräche mit Überlebenden des KZ-Außenlagers "Katzbach" in den Adlerwerken Frankfurt am Main. Hanau, 2005.

External links 
Nebenlager oder Außenkommandos Natzweiler-Struthof concentration camp memorial site
Die Außenlager des KZ Flossenbürg Flossenbürg concentration camp memorial site
Dachau subcamp (Bavarian State Office for Political Education Work)

Nazi concentration camps
Subcamps of Nazi concentration camps
Nazi terminology